Evrim Demirel (born November 17, 1977) is a Turkish composer and jazz pianist.

Evrim Demirel was educated in Izmir High School of Fine Arts and he studied piano with Nergis Sakirzade. Then he enrolled at Bilkent University in Ankara becoming a student in the Theory-Composition Department of the Music and Performing Arts Faculty. He earned his B.A. from this institution studying composition with Elhan Bakihanov, and went to the Netherlands for further music studies in Rotterdam Conservatory. He studied jazz piano under Rob van Kreeveld, electronic music under Rene Uijlenhoet and composition under Klaas de Vries and graduated from the composition and jazz- piano departments in 2005. Afterwards he has studied composition with Theo Loevendie in Amsterdam Conservatory and obtained his master's degree in 2007.

Demirel is known for his citations of styles and elements which could be called postmodern.

Works

Orchestra
2011  Concerto for Saxophone and Orchestra; for soprano/alto Saxophones and orchestra.
2010  Chamber Concerto; for violin, viola, piano and string orchestra.
2010  Fasıl No1; for kanun, ney, kemence, ud and orchestra.
2009  Symphony of Dialogue; for traditional Qur'an singer, soprano, baritone and orchestra.
2007  Five Pieces; for string orchestra.
2007  Devinim; for tanbur, kanun and string orchestra.
2006  Heterophonic; for orchestra.
2004  Ottoman Miniatures; for orchestra.
2004  Four Folk Songs From Anatolia; for soprano and 25 European and non-European instruments.
2003  Evolution; orchestra.

Chamber music
2010  Sint Nikolaas Suite; for tenor, children choir, piano, vibraphone, violin, viola cello, double bass.
2009  Kwintolen (Beshleme); for oboe, clarinet, alto saxophone, bass clarinet, bassoon.
2009  "The Porcelain Rabbit" (music for theatre); for violin, clarinet/bass clarinet and percussion.
2008  Darb-ı dügah; for kemençe, kanun, flute, clarinet, bass clarinet, harp, viola, cello, double bass.
2008  Cross-Linked; (version 2008) "Concerto for jazz pianist"; piano, flute, oboe, clarinet, bassoon, harp, violin, viola, cello, double bass.
2008  Oran - Orantı; (revised and premiered in 2013) for flute, oboe, clarinet, bassoon, piano, violin, viola, cello, double bass.
2008  Molto Rexlexivo; for piano and bass clarinet.
2007  The Lake; (revised in 2013)  for soprano, clarinet, viola, piano.
2006  Monologue; for duduk and tenor recorder.
2006  Saz Semaisi No. 2; for Eb clarinet, violin, cello, harp, piano.
2006  Quotations; flute/piccolo, oboe, Eb clarinet, bass clarinet, bassoon, horn, piano, harp, vibraphone/Turkish drum, violin, viola, cello, double bass.
2005  Makamsız; for recorder, kanun, viola da gamba, cello, marimba, darbuka.
2005  Saba In Istanbul; setar, ud, cornet, viola da gamba, bendir, tombak.
2004  Saz Semaisi No. 1; for Eb clarinet, violin, piano.
2004  Zeybek; for flute, oboe, clarinet, basoon, horn, trompet, trombone, tuba, piano, percussion.
2003  Telvin; for flute, oboe, clarinet, violin, viola, cello, double bass, guitar, mandolin, harp, darbuka, marimba.

Solo Piano and Jazz Combo
2008  Melankoli 
2008  In B 
2006  Tea of Loevendie 
2005  Blues Extended 
2005  Bosphorus 
2004  Davetiye 
2003  Kucuk Ada

Discography
 2006 Makamsiz; Kalan Music.
 2007 Red &White Blues; Attaca Records Piano: Marcel Worms
 2012 Ada; Evrim Demirel Ensemble, Kalan Music.

Recognition
 2004 2nd prize in Young Composers Award of Holland Symfonia.
 2003 nominated for International Lepo Sumera Composition Contest for Young Composers.

About
"Combining Western and non-Western instruments Demirel explores a wide variety of timbres. He does this with a keen intellectual understanding of the various elements he works with, achieving an extraordinary freshness in his music." 
Rene Van Peer - Critic
Being acquainted with Turkish composers since forty years or so, it is extremely refreshing for me to experience a young highly talented Turkish composer like Evrim Demirel who is capable of exploiting his Turkish roots in music in a more abstract way than the use of folk melodies. Of course there is nothing against that, as we know from Bartók, but as Bartók has shown also, it is more valuable, though more difficult, to integrate elements of folk traditions or any other tradition into a personal idiom. I experience a great joy seeing Evrim going his way on this Path.
Theo Loevendie - Composer

References
 https://web.archive.org/web/20061001022641/http://www.donemus.nl/componist.php?id=587
 http://www.atlasensemble.nl/en/inhoud_p/componisten.html

External links
 Official website

20th-century classical composers
Turkish composers
Turkish classical composers
Bilkent University alumni
Conservatorium van Amsterdam alumni
Living people
1977 births
Male classical composers
20th-century male musicians